During the 1970s, China would undergo a drastic economic changes that would lead to a rise of consumer culture. The rise of consumer culture in China would soon lead to the rise of unequal social class systems existing in modern China, heavy production rates, the introduction of extreme markets in China, and ultimately negative effects on the climate that would later contribute to the growing climate crisis that plagues China and the rest of the world today. This would be due to the high rates of production leading to a rise of air pollution and the burning of fossil fuels. The implications to the rise of mass consumerism, is mass production in China. As the demand for goods and luxury items began to skyrocket, the Chinese market needed to keep up with demand. Most of China's industrial workplaces and factories used fossil fuels to make these products as production only continued to grow by the end of the Mao era in the middle of the 1970s. This is when the effects of climate changes started to be noticed by the rest of the world and climatologists. The constant release of fossil fuels due to production of demanded goods have led to an increase of toxic gases such as carbon dioxide to be present in the air, and that has led to the Greenhouse effect, that traps these toxic chemicals in our ozone layer and lower atmosphere, leading to the increase of heat in the global climate.

Rise of Consumerism

China in the Mao Era 
While capitalism was generally looked down upon, during the end of the Mao Era China went through significant cultural and economic changes that would bring a rise of capitalism in the Chinese Market. This was due to the fact that the socialist party in China held views that had similarities to capitalist countries in the West. After the death of Mao Zedong who died on September 9, 1976, and the arrests of the Gang of Four, the Cultural Revolution in China had come to an end, and consumerism started to rise at a considerable rate.

This in turn would bring a rapid rise of product demand and the rise of production. Many voices in the Chinese communist party have pointed out that the structure of the country became a complete disaster during this time period due to the country drastically turning away from their own views. Consumerism as a whole played a large role during this period of cultural transformation as a whole in the 1970s. People were now starting to be introduced to goods they were restricted to have access to in the Mao Era. These newly demanded luxury items would include bicycles, wristwatches, wallets, and sewing machines. The amount of factories in China started to grow at an accelerated rate for production to match the growing demand within China. This would later increase as Chinese products began to be imported into foreign countries around the world at an extremely low price that would rival other non-native companies around the globe. However the rise of production would negatively affect the air quality in China as well as many factory workers who had to work in extremely poor conditions. Migrant workers were said to have worked seven days a week, having to suffer under 16 hour shifts each day. Many were paid extremely low wages in order to compensate for the low prices Chinese products had around the world. As well, during production large amounts of coal would be burned each day which would later result in around 40 people in China dying from horrible air conditions.

Consumerism as a whole played a large role during this period of cultural transformation as whole in the 1970s.  "An increasing number of people began to learn about new goods and earned a desire to obtain them in cities, state-owned factories, and administrative offices. Consumerism in China started taking power during the Mao Era that lasted from 1949 to 1976, and continuously expanded. People being able to acquire luxury items started to grow more and more common, and even though China was under Communist rule, capitalism began to grow in the country.

Economic Changes by Deng Xiaoping 

After the end of Mao's rule, Deng Xiaoping soon came into power in China in 1978. He would bring China out of economic burden as the country was suffering by making economic changes that would benefit the growth of the capitalist market in China. He also made efforts to improve China's foreign relations by trying to improve China's relationship with the United States as well as meet with the British Prime Minister Margaret Thatcher in 1984 to discuss China taking back Hong Kong from Britain. Xiaoping would also start with his economic reforms by making an effort by introducing foreign investors and brands to China to help improve the economy.

This would benefit and forever change everyday life in Chinese society and culture rapidly in the next few decades as a result. During the end of the Mao Era, millions of Chinese people have died or suffered from long periods of famine as the socialist government had failed to maintain these famines. The introduction of trademark brands would introduce Chinese citizens to a new world they were deprived of before. By the 1980s, China was overflowing with supermarkets, all-you-can- eat buffets, as well as convenience stores that were open twenty four hours for people to purchase goods and food. This new change would spread to smaller Chinese cities across the country, giving the population more access to goods that were once considered to be unattainable due to the scarce amount of necessities and goods to buy. The rise of urbanization and consumer culture would cause a significant change for a country that suffered from numerous famines and poverty. Since the 1970s, the amount of goods in shopping centers and markets have begun to rapidly grow and the Chinese population now has an abundance of products to buy from. It is estimated that by the year 2003 that grocery stores in China earn a total of $71 billion in sales, and carry a wide variety of food including fruits, vegetables, snacks, frozen products, alcohol, carbonated drinks, and desserts and were packed up. This is a stark difference to the scarcity and lack of options China had in 1978 where most of these options were not even available to purchase, as the only options were locally grown vegetables and rice in retail stores with poor service. The new economic changes brought to China would also drastically change spending habits in China. Back in 1978, the Chinese population spent around 58% of income on food, however in 2021, many people in China today only have to spend one third of their income on groceries.

In 1978, as economic changes were introduced to China, the country started to move away from a command economy, where the government was the one that decided how much food would be produced in an effort to reduce the amount of famines that occurred in China. Markets that were once banned during the Mao Era were now reintroduced into the country and the government now allowed the consumer to choose what to buy and how much production would be made. Farmers, private businesses, urban marketplaces, and fairs would heavily benefit from this change and soon make a large profit due to these economic changes.

From recent statistics, it is recorded that the Chinese population spends an average of 10 hours per week shopping compared to Americans who spend around an average of four hours shopping.

During the 1980s under Xiaoping's rule, China would commit to making foreign investments and improving relationships with other countries such as Britain and the United States. Foreign brands began to be introduced to China around the 1980s, and it is estimated that the Chinese  government received 20,000 trademark applications. In 2021, over thousands of foreign fast food chains such as McDonalds and KFC spread all out in urban centers and towns for people to easily access.

Setbacks of the Growth of Consumerism

Unequal Social Structures

The Wealthy Upper Class 
Consumer culture would affect the mentality of Chinese citizens as consumerism started to drastically affect everyday life. The economic reforms created by Deng Xiaoping back in the 1970s after he took power would result in China being a rural country to a booming consumer center that would end up producing brand new billionaires into the world and about a million millionaires. In 2021, Beijing will be known as the home of most of the billionaires in the world. With the emergence of billionaires and millionaires in Chinese society, their existence inspires the new culture in China on consumption of luxury items. While back in the 1990s, luxury items were rarely found in China outside of high class 5 star hotels, today many foreign luxury brands are found everywhere in Chinese malls and shopping centers. These brands would like Louis Vuitton, Calvin Klein, Lotos, Armani, Prada, and Gucci which are all known to be high class brands worldwide.

Chinese society would often favor the wealthy upper class that had recently emerged in the past few decades. Most of the wealthy upper class in China consists of middle aged and young people instead of the elderly. This was due to capitalism starting to gain more in China after the 1970s, and the growth of social classes began to unfold. People faced peer pressure to buy the most luxurious items from high end brands and competed with other people to see who could afford more goods. It was considered that if one's friend bought seven luxury items for themselves, you should buy that item eight times. China today is known to be one of the key consumers of luxury brands in the world as wealth was idolized in China's new society, and by the year 2005 was known to be the world's third largest consumer of luxury brands behind Japan and the United States with many people buying items like designer bags, smartphones, perfume, shoes, luxury cars and high brand clothes. For example, China became the largest consumer of luxury cars and is the largest buyer when it comes to a 728 Bentley Stretch Limo that is worth around 1.2 million dollars, putting it as the most expensive luxury car in the world. China was also listed as the third largest market behind the United States and Europe when it came to sales in jewelry. Many members of the wealthy Chinese class view drinks like wine as a symbol of the upper class as well.

This is a stark difference to how China was in the 1970s, where only about 1% of the population was able to obtain these items, as most of the population lived in poverty. Also by the year 2005, Chinese tourists were known to spend the total average of $1000 while shopping abroad per trip, listing them as the nationality to spend the most money globally in statistics. Many luxury brand producers see this as a benefit to them, as Chinese shoppers are now known to be their top consumers compared to those in the United States and in Europe.

Due to this newfound mentality, the wealthy millionaires were often seen as a symbol of Chinese consumer society, and often heavily depicted in popular media today to represent Chinese culture. A few examples of these depictions are the reality television series hosted on Netflix Bling Empire, the HBO reality series House of Ho, and the 2018 movie Crazy Rich Asians that was released into theaters in 2018. Status had started to become increasingly important in Chinese society as the desire to spend due to consumerism grew.

Migrants and the Poor 
However, as the rich upper class was praised in this consumer society, heavy social inequalities began to form as well. Many who were not part of the upper wealthy class resented the upper class for being out of touch with reality, and often gaining their wealth through illegal means while those who lived in poverty in the country suffered daily.

One example of a group that suffered immensely under the growth of the social class system in China are migrant workers who originate from the rural area of China. Many migrants from the rural area could not make enough money to support their families in their home villages, so many decide to travel to the urban areas in order to make a proper amount of money in order to support their families back home. This resulted in mass migrations by the millions in the past few decades after 1970, and many rural villages mainly had young adults moving to the cities, and the Chinese rural migration is known to be one of the largest mass migrations in the world. It is estimated that by 2030, China's urban population will reach up to 1 billion people. Urban areas in China are seen by the Chinese wealthy class as signs of luxury. Urbanization has brought massive wealth to China that would contribute to the rapid rise of China's global economy, however would also help create great poverty within the country, along with the introduction to Urban slums.

This would result in many members of the elderly and young children to be left behind in these villages by their parents. Many children who had they parents move to urban areas in order to find work often rarely see their parents as a result most of their lives due to their parents work, and many choose to make the choice to join their parents in urban cities once they are old enough instead of staying in their home villages in the rural areas of China. Many migrant workers in China contribute to the rise of China's economy by providing labor in Chinese factories in order to help out with production in demanded goods, working in food service, and contribute to the construction of new cities being built at an accelerated pace. However, despite being paid more in urban areas than they would back in their rural villages, they have to deal with working long grueling work shifts that can sometimes go up to 16 hours per day with low wages. Many were forced to live in slums where they were housed in one room apartments in Urban cities, however many refuse to return to their home villages in the rural area as jobs in urban regions are the only way to allow them to provide a survivable amount of money for their family. Many rural migrants have also experienced discrimination from people who are native to urban areas in China due to them on being considered "one of them".

Extreme Markets 
The rise of consumerism and production in China that began after the economic changes led to the reemergence of markets that existed before the communist era in China and the rise of extreme markets in China.

These extreme markets would include wet markets that sell wild animals for consumption, and well as underground sex shops. The introduction of extreme markets in China would emerge soon after the end of the Cultural Revolution in China and economic reforms started being made that would advance consumer culture in Chinese society. During the Mao Era, most markets were eliminated and it was extremely difficult for the Chinese population to buy necessities for themselves in order to survive. These extreme markets show the negative consequences of consumer culture's rise in China, as these markets have reached the point where they can no longer be controlled by the Chinese government, despite many efforts being made to do so. Due to the lack of regulation from the government, these markets would sell the services of wet nurses, sex workers, human organs, illegal drugs, young brides and even children. They would lead to the rise of human trafficking becoming a more common occurrence in the country, the adoption created a new consumer market in China, wet markets causing harm to the environment, and the rise of the sexual awakening in China. The rise of extreme markets in China is also a symbol that mass consumerism and consumer culture in China is now seemingly out of control.

Wet Markets 
During the last decade of the Mao Era, around 36 million people in the Chinese population died from famine. However, after Deng Xiaoping started to make economic reforms in order to reduce famines, Chinese farmers were to privately grow and produce their own source of food, and were allowed to directly sell their products to consumers. As the state no longer controlled food production and set fixed prices on products, this led to agricultural production and consumption in China increased rapidly. However, many farmers chose to hunt wildlife in order to provide for themselves and sell, and this led to the rise of wet markets in China. Often, these wild animals would be kept in poor conditions and caged close to one another. The transfer of diseases from animals to one another would become quite common as a result due to these poor regulations in these wet markets. These wet markets would also create damage to the environment and ecosystem as many endangered animals who were already at risk of being extinct were now being sold off for consumption. Rising incomes as a result of the new economic reforms, that allowed for more people to purchase rare animals in these wet markets. The consumption of these endangered animals in banquets was portrayed as a symbol of wealth and luxury, a lifestyle that was valued highly in China's new consumer culture. Many who also consumed the meat of these endangered animals may believe in superstitions where the consumption of these animals' meat would enhance certain behavior. Animals from all around the world, not just local Chinese wildlife, such as the Bengal Tiger, Asian leopards, lynx, otters, pangolin, bears, turtles, and Brazilian lizards are a few examples of animals that are sold at these markets. Smuggling rings started to transfer the skin and meat of these animals to wet markets despite the Chinese government's effort to reduce the amount of endangered animals sold at these markets. These smuggling rings will extend from China to regions all the way in South America. Over 5000 different endangered animals have been found to be sold in these smuggling rings. The Wildlife Protection Law that was passed in 1989 is one example of the Chinese government trying to regulate extreme markets like the wet market, however failed. This law made it illegal to buy or consume animals that were internationally protected and endangered, but consumption still continued. This has contributed to many animals like Tigers and Himalayan black bears almost going extinct due to excessive Chinese consumption. Due to these markets and the poor conditions animals face, China is met with international pressure from animal rights groups and European Parliament.

Human Trafficking 
The women and children sold in these extreme markets are victims of human trafficking that has become a common occurrence in China. Many children who are left unsupervised for a short period of time are at risk of being kidnapped and sold in these extreme markets, even if they are in their own homes. Many parents who are victims of having their children go missing often have to make organizations among themselves in order to find their children. Many parents who have reported their child's disappearance to the authorities or even government officials.

Negative Impacts on the Environment 
The rise of consumerism in China has helped boost the market and raise China's economy, but has played a part in severe damage to the environment and air pollution in China and the rest of the world. During the Mao Era, being wasteful was heavily looked down upon and it was encouraged that the Chinese population be frugal with their belonging. Personal consumption was heavily looked down upon and people often reused their personal belongings due to the mass amount of poverty that plagued China during the Mao Era. The Chinese population also had to deal with a scarce amount of products being available to purchase. By the 1990s however, people were free to easily deposit and buy as much goods and products as they pleased as the emergence of a wider variety of products due to higher production rates within China. However, the rise of consumer culture has led to the rise of wasteful habits as well as pollution. For example, by the 1990s, chopsticks were given out to be used and disposed off frequently. While this seems like a minor change in Chinese society, the easy disposal of chopsticks millions of trees being cut down to produce these disposable chopsticks that are handed out everyday in China. However, disposable products instead of reusable ones became a symbol of a civilized lifestyle, particularly by China's middle class that could afford this behavior. Many food markets and eating establishments have been switching to disposable products like chopsticks since the 1980s. Also, due to economic changes introduced back in the end of the 1970s, the Chinese population has grown accustomed to eating large proportions of food, especially meat. The consumption of meat was now considered in Chinese society to be a symbol of luxury, which was life that many people in China desired to have and showcase to their peers. Meat like beef, pork, and chicken is extremely common in almost every Chinese meal today, and this results in an increasing amount of livestock to be raised for future consumption. Due to constant grazing, many areas that were one grassland have turned to deserts in China with nearly a million acres of land in China being turned to a desert. This allows for more loose soil and dust to be picked up by the wind and travel around in the air, causing more population.

In order to raise livestock like cattle requires fields to be created in order to raise them. This results in millions of trees being plowed down every year in order, and this contributes to the rising carbon pollution in China. As trees get plowed down, there are less plants available to transfer carbon emission left in the air from pollution into oxygen through photosynthesis.

Also the rise of production has led to high releases of carbon emissions in the air as many factories spread across China burn fossil fuels like coal in order to produce goods to satisfy the growing demand of products by consumers in China and around the world. The buildup of carbon emission in the air contributes to the Green House effect in the Earth's lower atmosphere layer and ozone layer as carbon is a heat trapping gas. By the year 2018, China was known to be the largest producer of heat trapping emission in the world, with carbon emissions from the country exceeding emissions from the United States and Europe combined. China also burned the most coal in industrial production, as well as everyday uses like cooking or heating than the rest of the world's use combined, as well as recorded to have used about 2.8 billion tons of coal being used in 2008. The burning of coal takes up around 68.7% of the country's total energy consumption. The rise of pollution has also led to heavy smog to pollute cities constantly, and make the air quality in China almost insufferable to deal with. Around 64 people in China die each day due to poor air quality and thousands of people in the population die from premature deaths each year due to heavy toxic gases polluting the air in urban areas. The burning of coal in heavy production and other human activity in China also resulted in a mass amount of sulfur dioxide gas, methane, nitrous oxide, and fluorinated gases released into the air. The increasing amount of sulfur dioxide gas in the air has resulted in multiple cases of acid rain to occur in China.

This is due to China having the largest population of people in the world, with around 1.4 billion people living in China as of 2020. The large population consumes and uses up a vast amount of resources at an extremely rapid pace. If the entire Chinese population continues to follow a new pattern of behavior created by consumer culture, then China will use up more than twice the amount of resources than the United States.

China's Impact on the Market 
The rise of mass production and consumerism in China has introduced the rise of capitalist competition. China had entered the global market quite late compared to the rest of the western world, but was quick to quickly make a big impact with rapid production of demanded goods and cheap prices that rival companies globally. Since the 1990s, China has risen significantly economically and in the global market with rapid production rates and incredibly cheap prices on Chinese made products.

Foreign Relations 

This competition between the United States and China has had a severely negative impact on US-Sino relations in the 2010s and the rise anti-Chinese sentiments in the United States. Many companies shifted their position around 2010. A legal scholar  said there was an "anti-China corporate insurgency" in the United States. The United States wants its people to fear the power that China is gaining in the global market. The question "Is China Buying the World" is likely created in order to have more people afraid of China's rapid development.  The United States even has made efforts in the past decade in order to prevent China's economy from growing, with one example being the Trans-Pacific Partnership (TPP) free trade agreement.

References 

Chinese culture